Frederick E. Hyde Fjord is a fjord in Peary Land, far northern Greenland.

History
The fjord was named by Robert Peary during his 1900 expedition after Frederick Erastus Hyde, one of the founding members and first vice-president of the Peary Arctic Club in New York. Peary did not explore the fjord owing to thick fog. The inner fjord branches were mapped and named by Lauge Koch in the course of aerial surveys from the 1920s onwards.

The landscape of this desolate fjord caused an impression on Danish Arctic explorer Eigil Knuth:

Geography
To the east Frederick E. Hyde Fjord opens into the Arctic Ocean with its mouth just to the north of Cape John Flagler and south of Cape Bridgman. The fjord extends  in a WSW direction until the Harebugt at its head. The Nordpasset is a glacial valley that extends a further  in a WNW direction until the head of O.B. Boggild Fjord, part of the De Long Fjord complex.

The Roosevelt Range, the northernmost mountain range on earth, stretches from west to east on the northern side of the fjord along with its subranges. Hans Egede Land extends to the south of the fjord from its middle reaches to the mouth area.
Nordkrone has many glaciers and is intersected by deep ravines with steep sides.  high Wistar Bjerg, one of the highest points in Peary Land, rises above the fjord between the Freya and Thor fjords at the edge of the plateau.

See also
List of fjords of Greenland

References

External links
Picture of Frigg Fjord